El Museo de Tradiciones y Leyendas is located in León, Nicaragua. The museum building was once the infamous XXI prison where, from 1921 to 1979, many prisoners were tortured. Today, the prison cells depict Nicaraguan traditions and legends through puppet illustration, while wall paintings portray how tortured prisoners suffered.

The museum charges an admission fee. A Spanish guided tour is available.

See also 
 List of museums in Nicaragua

External links 
 Museo de Leyendas y Tradiciones information

Museums in Nicaragua
Prison museums in South America
Defunct prisons in Nicaragua
León Department